Kuchlak, also Kuchlagh, is a town near Quetta, in the province of Balochistan, Pakistan. It is governed by a union council in Chiltan Town, Quetta. Kuchlak is home to Halaqa Number 61, one of the largest halaqas in Quetta. Kuchlak is well known for summer fruits such as apples and peaches; however, soil aridity is a problem. Vegetables grown in the valley include tomatoes, potatoes, onions and turnips.

Climate
Kuchlak has a continental arid climate with great variation between summer and winter temperatures. Autumn runs from late September to mid-November, with average temperatures in the  range. Winter starts in late November and ends in late March, with average temperatures near  and snow during the months of January and February. Unlike most of Pakistan, Kuchlak does not have a monsoon with sustained, heavy rainfall; snowfall during the winter months is the principal mode of precipitation.

Education
Arbab Ghulam Ali Kasi Government Inter College is the only institute of higher learning in Kuchlak. There are three boys public high schools, two girls high schools and many primary and middle schools. Several private educational institutions and schools also exist in the town. For higher education, most students are travel over 25 km daily to Quetta (the nearest city) for study in tertiary educational institutions such as:
University of Balochistan (UoB)
Balochistan University of Information Technology, Engineering and Management Sciences (BUITEMS)
Iqra University
Government Science College, Quetta
Government Degree College
Bolan Medical College and Hospital
Al-Hamd University
Government Girls Degree College, Quetta
Government Girls Degree College, Quarry Road, Quetta
Sardar Bahadur Khan Women's University Brewery Road Western Bypass, Quetta
Noble Institute of Computer Programming Kuchlak.

Sports
The following sports are popular:
Cricket ☆☆☆☆☆
Football ☆☆☆
Volleyball 
Bodybuilding ☆☆☆
Cycling ☆☆
Mountaineering
Horseback riding ☆
Buz-Kashi (new in north Kuchlak)
Wrestling (Ghaiza in Balochi)

Taliban presence
In August 2019, it was reported that the area has served as the Taliban's main meeting place, medical center, and resting place after combat. The town's Khair Ul Madarais mosque, which was bombed in August 2019, was the main meeting place for the Taliban.

See also
Pishin
Chaman
Qilla Abdullah
Ziarat
Qilla Saifullah
Loralai
Zhob
Afghanistan
Kandahar
Helmand
Herat
Kabul

References

Populated places in Quetta District